Uintah Basin Technical College (UBTech) is a public technical college in Roosevelt, Utah with an additional campus in Vernal.  It serves high school students and adults in Daggett, Duchesne, Uintah counties. UBTech is a part of the Utah System of Technical Colleges and offers certificate programs in Business & Industry, Medical, Energy Services, and Trades.

External links
 Official website

Educational institutions established in 1968
Buildings and structures in Duchesne County, Utah
Utah College of Applied Technology Colleges
Education in Duchesne County, Utah
Education in Uintah County, Utah
Educational institutions accredited by the Council on Occupational Education
1968 establishments in Utah